Alex John Banal (born December 28, 1988), more commonly known as A. J. “Bazooka” Banal, is a Filipino professional boxer. Banal resides in Ermita, Cebu City, Cebu, where he trains in the city's famed ALA Boxing Gym.

Early life
Banal's interest in boxing began through the inspiration of his uncle, Roselito Campaña, who was also a boxer for the ALA Boxing Gym. At the age of three, Banal joined the ALA team as an amateur, and has been with the organization ever since.

Professional career

Super Flyweight
Banal, aspiring to succeed in the sport, turned pro during the year of 2005. His first opponent being unheralded Sonny Saguing. The bout ended with a technical draw, with Banal suffering a big cut on his eyebrow due to an unintentional headbutt. Banal was very disappointed in the outcome of the fight, and aspired to keep his then undefeated record intact.

Banal underwent a huge change in competition in only his second year as a pro. He faced tougher opposition, compared to the fighters he previously faced at the time, fighting prospects, who like him, were undefeated. Banal had a record of 7-0-1 when he faced undefeated Indonesian prospect Ali Rochmad (13-0), whom Banal easily defeated with a 5th-round knockout (KO). Two months later, he faced undefeated Thai prospect Janesuk King Sports (11-0), who retired from the bout after the sixth round. And just a month after fighting the then undefeated Thai, Banal fought and defeated highly rated Indonesian contender, Angky Angkota, who sported a record of 17-3 before he lost to Banal by unanimous decision (UD).

Super Flyweight Contention
After winning his next five fights, including his U.S. debut, Banal then had a chance to collect his first regional belt, facing Esau Gaona of Mexico. Banal easily defeated the Mexican, winning the bout with a first-round KO with a powerful straight to the jaw, winning the then vacant WBO Asia Pacific Youth super flyweight title. He then defended his title for the first and last time against Mexican Jovanny Soto, whom he defeated with a ninth-round technical knockout.

After the Soto bout, Banal had an opportunity to fight for the mandatory contender spot in an IBF super flyweight title eliminator. On April 6, 2008, in Quezon City, Philippines, Banal fought the then undefeated Caril Herrera of Uruguay (21-0) for this challenge. Banal, not to disappoint, defeated the then undefeated fighter with a fourth-round TKO, earning a shot at the IBF super flyweight title.

First career loss
Although he won a chance for the IBF title, Banal turned down the opportunity in order to fight under another sanctioning body. On July 26, 2008, in the Cebu Coliseum in Cebu City, Banal fought for the interim WBA super flyweight title. Despite leading in all three judges' scorecards, he lost by knockout to Panama's Rafael Concepción. Banal took a right hand to the temple region in Round 10 from Concepción, after being knocked down, he then took a knee throughout the referee's count, marking his first ever defeat in his professional career.

Bantamweight
Following his knockout loss to Concepción, Banal moved up one weight class, to the bantamweight division. On January 31, 2009, in Banal's bantamweight debut, he faced Indonesian Nouldy Manakane, whom he defeated by knockout in just four rounds of action. He then faced Tanzanian Mbwana Matumla, four months later, who he defeated in just two rounds. Following his two knockout wins over Manakane and Matumla, he faced rugged Mexican Jose Angel Beranza in the undercard of Brian Viloria's first title defense of his newly won IBF light flyweight title, in Honolulu, Hawaii. Banal was unable to knockout the always forwarding Mexican, but was able to prevail by UD, with scores of 99–92, 98–92, and 99–91, all in favor of AJ "Bazooka" Banal.

On January 14, 2010, Banal defeated a former 4-time world title challenger in Cecilio Santos of Mexico. Banal, cheered by his hometown fans in Cebu, was hesitant to begin the fight. But in the following two rounds, Banal began to hit his mark. And finally, in the 4th round of the bout, Banal was able to land his dangerous left hook to the temple, followed up with his trademark aggression, eventually sending Santos to the canvas. The Mexican, with all his might just couldn't continue, and was eventually counted out in the 35-second mark of the 4th round, further pushing Banal to hopefully another world title fight.

Banal fought Japan's Big Yoo (16-2; 11 KO) on July 17, 2010 at the Carlos P. Garcia Stadium, Tagbilaran City, Bohol. The Filipino fighter won the bout by KO in the 5th round.

On October 31, 2010, Banal won by disqualification against the veteran Luis Alberto Perez. Banal won the first 6 rounds of the fight until round 7, the veteran Perez came back and give heavy blows that staggers Banal. After the referee break them Perez clinch a punch on Banal and made Banal unable to continue. Banal won by DQ.

World title shot

On October 21 Banal loses to Thailand's Pungluang Sor Singyu with the later taking the vacant WBO bantamweight title, with a ninth-round TKO. The fight took place at the Mall of Asia Arena.

Professional boxing record

{|class="wikitable" style="text-align:center; font-size:95%"
|-
!No.
!Result
!Record
!Opponent
!Type
!Round, time
!Date
!Location
!Notes
|- align=center
|39
|Win||36–2–1||align=left| Master Suro
|UD
|10
|2018-05-13
|align=left|
|align=left|
|- align=center
|38
|Win||35–2–1||align=left| Jason Egera
|SD
|6
|2017-12-16
|align=left|
|align=left|
|- align=center
|37
|Win||34–2–1||align=left| Emilio Norfat
|TKO
|3 (10), 
|2015-11-28
|align=left|
|align=left|
|- align=center
|36
|Win||33–2–1||align=left| Junior Bajawa
|UD
|8
|2015-11-28
|align=left|
|align=left|
|- align=center
|35
|Win||32–2–1||align=left| Maxsaisai Sithsaithong
|UD
|10
|2014-11-15
|align=left|
|align=left|
|- align=center
|34
|Win
|31-2-1
|align=left| Defry Palulu
|KO
|2 (10), 
|2014-06-21
|align=left| 
|align=left|
|- align=center
|33
|Win
|30-2-1
|align=left| Manuel Gonzalez Garcia
|UD
|10
|2013-11-30
|align=left| 
|align=left|
|- align=center
|32
|Win
|29-2-1
|align=left| Abraham Gomez
|RTD
|2 (10), 
|2013-07-13
|align=left|
|align=left|
|- align=center
|31
|Loss
|28-2-1
|align=left| Pungluang Sor Singyu
|TKO
|9 (12), 
|2012-10-20
|align=left|
|align=left| 
|- align=center
|30
|Win
|28-1-1
|align=left| Ruben Manakane
|UD
|8
|2012-07-21
|align=left|
|align=left|
|- align=center
|29
|Win
|27-1-1
|align=left| Raul Hidalgo
|TKO
|1 (12), 
|2012-03-24
|align=left|
|align=left|
|- align=center
|28
|Win
|26-1-1
|align=left| Mario Briones
|UD
|12
|2011-10-08
|align=left|
|align=left|
|- align=center
|27
|Win
|25-1-1
|align=left| Tyson Cave
|TD
|8 (12), 
|2011-07-30
|align=left|
|align=left|
|- align=center
|26
|Win
|24-1-1
|align=left| Francis Miyeyusho
|KO
|2 (12), 
|2011-03-19
|align=left|
|align=left|
|- align=center
|25
|Win
|23-1-1
|align=left| Luis Alberto Pérez
|DQ
|7 (10), 
|2010-10-30
|align=left|
|align=left|
|- align=center
|24
|Win
|22-1-1
|align=left| Hayato Kimura
|KO
|5 (12), 
|2010-07-17
|align=left|
|align=left|
|- align=center
|23
|Win
|21-1-1
|align=left| Cecilio Santos
|KO
|4 (10), 
|2010-01-14
|align=left|
|align=left|
|- align=center
|22
|Win
|20-1-1
|align=left| Jose Angel Beranza
|UD
|10
|2009-08-29
|align=left|
|align=left|
|- align=center
|21
|Win
|19-1-1
|align=left| Mbwana Matumla
|KO
|2 (10), 
|2009-05-16
|align=left|
|align=left|
|- align=center
|20
|Win
|18-1-1
|align=left| Nouldy Manakane
|KO
|4 (10), 
|2009-01-31
|align=left|
|align=left|
|- align=center
|19
|Loss
|17-1-1
|align=left| Rafael Concepción
|KO
|10 (12), 
|2008-07-26
|align=left|
|align=left|
|- align=center
|18
|Win
|17-0-1
|align=left| Caril Herrera
|KO
|4 (12), 
|2008-04-06
|align=left|
|align=left|
|- align=center
|17
|Win
|16-0-1
|align=left| Jovanny Soto
|TKO
|9 (10), 
|2007-12-02
|align=left|
|align=left|
|- align=center
|16
|Win
|15-0-1
|align=left| Esau Gaona
|KO
|1 (10), 
|2013-01-20
|align=left|
|align=left|
|- align=center
|15
|Win
|14-0-1
|align=left| Jorge Cardenas
|TKO
|3 (6), 
|2007-08-11
|align=left|
|align=left|
|- align=center
|14
|Win
|13-0-1
|align=left| Juan Alberto Rosas
|UD
|8
|2007-05-05
|align=left|
|align=left|
|- align=center
|13
|Win
|12-0-1
|align=left| Komrit Lukkuongmuekol
|TKO
|1 (8), 
|2007-02-24
|align=left|
|align=left|
|- align=center
|12
|Win
|11-0-1
|align=left| Terdkiat Jandaeng
|TKO
|9 (10), 
|2007-01-20
|align=left|
|align=left|
|- align=center
|11
|Win
|10-0-1
|align=left| Angky Angkotta
|UD
|10
|2006-10-21
|align=left|
|align=left|
|- align=center
|10
|Win
|9-0-1
|align=left| Tabthong Tor Buamas
|RTD
|6 (10), 
|2006-09-23
|align=left|
|align=left|
|- align=center
|9
|Win
|8-0-1
|align=left| Ali Rochmad
|KO
|5 (10), 
|2006-07-22
|align=left|
|align=left|
|- align=center
|8
|Win
|7-0-1
|align=left| Jun Pader
|TKO
|4 (8), 
|2006-07-03
|align=left|
|align=left|
|- align=center
|7
|Win
|6-0-1
|align=left| Bangsaen Sithpraprom
|KO
|2(8), 
|2006-04-30
|align=left|
|align=left|
|- align=center
|6
|Win
|5-0-1
|align=left| Dechapol Kokietgym
|KO
|1 (6)
|2006-03-18
|align=left|
|align=left|
|- align=center
|5
|Win
|4-0-1
|align=left| John Clifford Ranan
|TKO
|3 (6)
|2006-02-19
|align=left|
|align=left|
|- align=center
|4
|Win
|3-0-1
|align=left| Rodel Veronque
|TKO
|5 (6)
|2006-01-15
|align=left|
|align=left|
|- align=center
|3
|Win
|2-0-1
|align=left| Rodel Veronque
|UD
|4
|2005-11-19
|align=left|
|align=left|
|- align=center
|2
|Win
|1-0-1
|align=left| Julius Cabusas
|KO
|1 (4)
|2005-09-17
|align=left|
|align=left|
|- align=center
|1
|style="background:#abcdef;"|Draw
|0-0-1
|align=left| Sonny Saguing
|TD
|2 (4)
|2005-06-11
|align=left|
|align=left|

References

External links

1988 births
Visayan people
Bantamweight boxers
Super-flyweight boxers
Living people
Sportspeople from Cebu City
Boxers from Cebu
Southpaw boxers
Filipino male boxers
People from Bukidnon